William Thomas Trotter Jr. is an American mathematician, who is on the faculty of the Department of Mathematics at the Georgia Institute of Technology. His main expertise is partially ordered sets, but he has also done significant work in other areas of combinatorics, such as the Szemerédi–Trotter theorem and Chvátal-Rödl-Szemerédi-Trotter theorem.

Trotter is the author of the book Combinatorics and partially ordered sets: dimension theory (Johns Hopkins University Press, 1992). With Mitchel Keller, he is also the author of a self-published textbook, Applied Combinatorics (2017).

References

External links
William T. (Tom) Trotter

Living people
20th-century American mathematicians
21st-century American mathematicians
Georgia Tech faculty
Year of birth missing (living people)